Babett Peter (born 12 May 1988) is a German professional footballer. She plays as a defender for Real Madrid CF. She has also played for Germany.

Club career

Turbine Potsdam
Peter started playing football in primary school. At the age of nine, her parents took her to the local football club FSV Oschatz. She later played for 1. FC Lokomotive Leipzig and was called up for German national teams at the junior level. During the winter break of the 2005–06 season, she moved to 1. FFC Turbine Potsdam, winning the Bundesliga title and the German Cup in her first season. In September 2007, Peter received the Fritz Walter medal in gold as the best female junior player of the year. One month later, she scored her first Bundesliga goal for Potsdam against SG Essen-Schönebeck from the penalty spot.

From 2009 to 2011, Peter won three consecutive Bundesliga titles with Turbine Potsdam. In the 2009–10 season, Potsdam also claimed the inaugural UEFA Women's Champions League title, with Peter scoring during the penalty shoot-out in the final. One year later, Potsdam again made it to the final, but lost against Olympique Lyonnais.

1. FFC Frankfurt
On 29 February 2012, Peter signed a three-year contract and moved to 1. FFC Frankfurt on 1 July 2012.

Wolfsburg
In March 2014, Babett joined VfL Wolfsburg. She won three Frauen-Bundesliga titles with Wolfsburg as well as the DFB-Pokal Frauen five times.

CD Tacón
On 17 September 2019, VfL Wolfsburg agreed to mutually terminate Babett's contract so she could immediately join Spanish Primera División team CD Tacón, signing a two-year deal with the Madrid-based club.

International career
Peter made her debut in the German national team in March 2006 against Finland. She was part of Germany's winning team at the 2007 FIFA Women's World Cup, but did not play in any game. One year later, she won the bronze medal at the 2008 Summer Olympics, where she became a regular starter for Germany in the knockout stage of the tournament. Peter was part of Germany's team winning the country's seventh title at the 2009 European Championship. She scored her first goal for the national team at the Algarve Cup facing China in March 2010. Peter was called up for Germany's 2011 FIFA Women's World Cup squad.

She was part of the squad for the 2016 Summer Olympics, where Germany won the gold medal.

On 26 April 2019, she announced her retirement from the national team.

International goals
Scores and results list Germany's goal tally first:

Source:

Personal life
Peter graduated from the Potsdam Sports Gymnasium in June 2007, receiving her Abitur diploma. In October 2007, she became a member of the sports support group of the German Armed Forces (Bundeswehr). Since the age of five, Peter has suffered from facial nerve paralysis. At the age of 15, she had an operation which improved her condition.

Peter began a relationship with the American soccer player Ella Masar. In September 2020, Masar gave birth to a baby boy. She married Masar on 21 July 2022.

Honours

Club
Turbine Potsdam
UEFA Women's Champions League: Winner 2009–10
Bundesliga: Winner 2005–06, 2008–09, 2009–10, 2010–11, 2011–12
DFB-Pokal: Winner 2005–06

1. FFC Frankfurt
DFB Pokal: Winner 2013–14

VfL Wolfsburg
Bundesliga: Winner 2016–17, 2017–18, 2018–19
DFB Pokal: Winner 2014–15, 2015–16, 2016–17, 2017–18, 2018–19

International
FIFA World Cup: Winner 2007
UEFA European Championship: Winner 2009
Summer Olympic Games: Bronze medal: 2008, Gold medal: 2016
Algarve Cup: Winner 2006, 2012, 2014

Individual
Silbernes Lorbeerblatt: 2007, 2016
Fritz Walter Medal– Gold: 2007

Notes

References

External links
  
 Profile at DFB 
 Player German domestic football stats at DFB 
 
 
 
 
 

1988 births
Living people
People from Oschatz
People from Bezirk Leipzig
German women's footballers
German expatriate women's footballers
German expatriate sportspeople in Spain
Expatriate women's footballers in Spain
Footballers from Saxony
Germany women's international footballers
1. FFC Frankfurt players
1. FFC Turbine Potsdam players
VfL Wolfsburg (women) players
Real Madrid Femenino players
Primera División (women) players
2007 FIFA Women's World Cup players
2011 FIFA Women's World Cup players
2015 FIFA Women's World Cup players
Women's association football defenders
Frauen-Bundesliga players
UEFA Women's Championship-winning players
FIFA Century Club
Olympic footballers of Germany
Footballers at the 2008 Summer Olympics
Footballers at the 2016 Summer Olympics
Olympic medalists in football
Olympic gold medalists for Germany
Olympic bronze medalists for Germany
Medalists at the 2008 Summer Olympics
Medalists at the 2016 Summer Olympics
FIFA Women's World Cup-winning players
Recipients of the Silver Laurel Leaf
Lesbian sportswomen
German LGBT sportspeople
LGBT association football players
20th-century German women
21st-century LGBT people
UEFA Women's Euro 2017 players